Kataja is a Finnish surname meaning the common juniper. Notable people with the surname include:

Erkki Kataja (1924–1969), Finnish pole vaulter
Janne Kataja (born 1980), Finnish comedian, actor and tv-host
Jouko Kataja (1953–2018), Finnish footballer
Ria Kataja (born 1975), Finnish actress

Finnish-language surnames